Winfield High School may refer to:
Winfield High School (Alabama)
Winfield High School (Kansas)
Winfield High School (Missouri) - Winfield R-IV School District
Winfield High School (West Virginia)